George Ross Anderson Jr. (January 29, 1929December 1, 2020) was an American attorney, politician, and jurist who served as a judge of the United States District Court for the District of South Carolina. After graduating from Southeastern University and George Washington University, Anderson served for a year in the US Air Force during the Korean War. He worked in private legal practice from 1954 and was elected to the South Carolina House of Representatives for a one-year term in 1955. Anderson became a federal judge in 1980, nominated by President Jimmy Carter. He assumed senior status in 2009 and retired in 2016.

Early life and education

Anderson was born in Anderson, South Carolina. His father worked for the Equinox textile mill but forbid his son from working there. Anderson instead had a number of jobs, including delivering newspapers and roofing. He earned his Bachelor of Commercial Science degree from Southeastern University in 1949, studied political science at George Washington University from 1949 to 1951, and received a Bachelor of Laws from the University of South Carolina School of Law in 1954.

Career 
He was a legislative assistant to United States Senator Olin D. Johnston from 1947 to 1951 and from 1953 to 1954. He served in the United States Air Force from 1951 to 1952, attaining the rank of Staff Sergeant. He served as a finance instructor and historian to an air wing during the Korean War.

Anderson served in the South Carolina House of Representatives from 1955 to 1956, and practiced law in Anderson from 1954 to 1980. He was unpopular during his single term in the state legislature due to his support for prison expansion. During his career, Anderson was an early fingerprint analyst for the Federal Bureau of Investigation, helped to design the water supply system for Anderson County and arranged for cable television to be installed in the area. Anderson was one of the twelve founders of South Carolina Association for Justice, and its president from 1971 to 1972. They honored him with a lifetime achievement award shortly before he took senior status.

Federal judicial service
Sponsored by United States Senator Fritz Hollings, Anderson was nominated by President Jimmy Carter on April 18, 1980, to a seat on the United States District Court for the District of South Carolina vacated by Judge James Robert Martin Jr. He was confirmed by the United States Senate on May 21, 1980, and received his commission on May 23, 1980. He assumed senior status on January 29, 2009, his 80th birthday. His service terminated on March 1, 2016, due to his retirement.

Later life and death 
A federal courthouse was renamed in honor of Anderson in 2002, a rare honor for a living judge. The student center at Anderson University was named after him in 2015 and was one of his last public appearances. He was awarded the Order of the Palmetto by South Carolina. Anderson suffered declining health in later life and died on December 1, 2020, at a South Carolina nursing home.

References

External links
 
 

1929 births
2020 deaths
Employees of the United States Senate
George Washington University Law School alumni
Judges of the United States District Court for the District of South Carolina
People from Anderson, South Carolina
Military personnel from South Carolina
South Carolina lawyers
United States Air Force airmen
United States district court judges appointed by Jimmy Carter
20th-century American judges
21st-century American judges
20th-century American politicians
University of South Carolina School of Law alumni
Members of the South Carolina House of Representatives